Adutiškis is a town in Švenčionys district municipality, in Vilnius County, in northeast Lithuania. According to the 2011 census, the town has a population of 689 people. The town is located near Kamaja river, and at the border with Belarus. There are the Church of St.  Virgin Mary Scapular, built in 1913, Adutiškis Secondary School, customs office, post office and retirement home in Adutiškis

History
In autumn of 1941, the Jews from the town were taken to the Švenčionėliai military training ground and executed along with other Jews of the Švenčionys district. This crime was perpetrated by an Einsatzgruppen of Adutiškis policemen.

References 

Belarus–Lithuania border
Towns in Lithuania
Towns in Vilnius County
Sventsyansky Uyezd
Wilno Voivodeship (1926–1939)
Holocaust locations in Lithuania
Jewish communities destroyed in the Holocaust